Nanyingmen Subdistrict is a subdistrict situated on the west of Heping District, Tianjin. it shares border with Quanyechang Subdistrict in its north, Wudadao Subdistrict in its east, Xinxing Subdistrict in its south, as well as Xuefu and Wanxing Subdistricts in its west. In 2010, It had a population of 47,306.

The name Nanyingmen literally translates to "South Camp Gate".

History

Administrative divisions 
At the time of writing, Nanyingmen Subdistrict is composed of 10 communities, which are listed as follows:

Landmark 

 St. Joseph Cathedral

Gallery

References 

Township-level divisions of Tianjin
Heping District, Tianjin